State elections were held in South Australia on 19 March 1938. All 39 seats in the South Australian House of Assembly were up for election. The incumbent Liberal and Country League government led by Premier of South Australia Richard L. Butler defeated the opposition Australian Labor Party led by Leader of the Opposition Andrew Lacey.

Background
This election was the start of the electoral malapportionment which became known as the Playmander. It consisted of rural districts enjoying a 2-to-1 advantage in the state parliament, even though they contained less than half of the population, as well as a change from multi-member to single-member electorates, and the number of MPs in the lower house was reduced from 46 to 39. Labor remained out of power until the 1965 election.

Tom Stott was one of 14 of 39 lower house MPs to be elected as an independent, which as a grouping won 40 percent of the primary vote, more than either of the major parties. Stott was the de facto leader of the independent caucus within parliament. The incumbent Butler LCL minority government only won 15 of 39 seats, which led to uncertainty over which party, if any, could form government.  This confusion led Stott, as the most experienced and well known of the independent MPs, to believe that he could become Premier of South Australia. He failed to gain the support of sufficient independents and LCL members to achieve this but, as the de facto leader of the independent caucus within parliament, the LCL government were often forced to rely on his support.

Results

|}

See also
Results of the South Australian state election, 1938 (House of Assembly)
Candidates of the South Australian state election, 1938
Members of the South Australian House of Assembly, 1938-1941
Members of the South Australian Legislative Council, 1938–1941
Playmander

References

History of South Australian elections 1857-2006, volume 1: ECSA
State and federal election results  in Australia since 1890

Elections in South Australia
1938 elections in Australia
1930s in South Australia
March 1938 events